One Step Higher is the fourth and last album by Voyage, recorded and released in the United States in December 1981 on Atlantic Records while the other version of this album was re-released again in France on Sirocco Records in 1982 and the rest of different versions on different record labels that same year from different countries. The song "Come And Get It" featured Arthur Simms on lead vocals.

Track listing

All songs composed by Marc Chantereau, Pierre-Alain Dahan, and Slim Pezin.

Side A
 "Let's Get Started" — 6:42
 "Come and Get It" — 4:17
 "One Step Higher" — 5:43

Side B
 "I Surrender" – 4:53
 "Nowhere to Hide" – 3:25
 "Magic in the Groove" – 3:45
 "Follow the Brightest Star" – 6:42

Personnel

 Arranged by Marc Chantereau, Pierre-Alain Dahan, Slim Pezin
 Horns on "I Surrender" Arranged by – Don Ray 
 Bass – Slim Pezin
 Bass on "Let's Get Started" and "Come And Get It" – Tony Bonfils
 Cover – Luigi Castiglioni
 Drums – Pierre-Alain Dahan
 Engineer – Claude Grillis, Stephen W. Tayler
 Executive Producer – Claudette Tokarz, Roger Tokarz
 Guitar – Slim Pezin
 Lead Vocals  on "Come And Get It"– Arthur Simms
 Mixed By – Claude Grillis on "One Step Higher", Gene Leone on "Magic In The Groove", Stephen W. Tayler
 Percussion – Marc Chantereau, Pierre-Alain Dahan
 Producer – Marc Chantereau, Pierre-Alain Dahan, Roger Tokarz, Slim Pezin
 Synthesizer Programming  – Georges Rodi
 Vocals – Ann Calvert, Arthur Simms, Bobby McGee, Carole Fredericks, George Chandler, Georges Costa, Jimmy Chambers, Jimmy Thomas, Kay Garner, Marc Chantereau, Michel Costa, Pierre-Alain Dahan, Slim Pezin, Stephanie de Sykes, Yvonne Jones

External links

1981 albums
Voyage (band) albums
Atlantic Records albums